See "Waffen-SS divisions" for the Waffen-SS order of battle

The Allgemeine-SS regional commands were titled SS-Oberabschnitte (SS Main Districts) and first were established on November 16, 1933. They replaced the earlier command structure composed of five SS-Gruppen and comprised the regional component of the Allgemeine-SS command structure. They reported to the SS-Amt (SS Office), in 1935 renamed the SS-Hauptamt (SS Main Offfice). Their commanders carried the title of SS-Oberabschnitte Führer and usually held the rank of SS-Gruppenführer or SS-Obergruppenführer. Beginning in November 1937, when the Higher SS and Police Leaders were established, the SS-Oberabschnitte were subordinated to them. However, in nearly every instance, the SS-Oberabschnitt Führer held both positions simultaneously. The Oberabschnitt Führer's staff was headed by a Stabschef (Chief of Staff) who oversaw departments encompassing administration, training, personnel, medical affairs, as well as specialty units such as signals and engineer battalions. 

 
These regional commands originally existed only in Germany and Austria and generally conformed to the existing Wehrkreis (Military Districts) of the Wehrmacht. During the Second World War, additional Oberabschnitte were established for six conquered areas (Baltic States & Byelorussia, Bohemia and Moravia, Netherlands, Norway, Poland and Ukraine). Other occupied territories, however, did not have Oberabschnitte established, and SS personnel there were directly under the jurisdiction of the Higher SS and Police Leader for that area. By 1944, there were a total of 23 active Oberabschnitte.

Oberabschnitte Commands
The following table lists, by date of formation, the existing Oberabschnitte commands that were established from November 1933 through April 1944.

Notes

References

Sources

Further reading

Nazi Germany
Allgemeine SS